Amursky (masculine), Amurskaya (feminine), or Amurskoye (neuter) is the name of several rural localities in Russia:
Amursky, Altai Krai, a settlement in Biysky District of Altai Krai
Amursky, Chelyabinsk Oblast, a settlement in Bredinsky District of Chelyabinsk Oblast
Amurskoye, a selo in Belogorsky District of Amur Oblast